Heat Wave is the fifth album by The Jazz Crusaders recorded in 1963 and released on the Pacific Jazz label.

Reception

AllMusic rated the album with 2 stars; in his review, Scott Yanow said: "Some of the material is rather unlikely for the popular hard bop group ...but the band performs those tunes plus a few originals with their usual ingenuity and soulful approach".

Track listing 
 "On Broadway" (Barry Mann, Cynthia Weil, Jerry Leiber, Mike Stoller) - 2:27
 "Green Back Dollar" (Hoyt Axton, Ken Ramsey) - 2:20
 "Close Shave" (Joe Sample) - 2:35
 "Free Sample" (Sample) - 3:31
 "Mr. Sandman" (Pat Ballard) - 2:58
 "Heat Wave" (Irving Berlin) - 2:52
 "Sassy" (Les McCann) - 4:27
 "Theme from The L-Shaped Room (T-Shaped Twist)" (John Barry) - 4:11
 "Some Samba" (Wayne Henderson) - 2:35
 "Stix March" (Stix Hooper) - 2:44
 "Purple Onion" (Wilton Felder) - 2:55

Personnel 
The Jazz Crusaders
Wayne Henderson - trombone
Wilton Felder - tenor saxophone
Joe Sample - piano, harpsichord
Bobby Haynes - bass
Stix Hooper - drums

References 

The Jazz Crusaders albums
1963 albums
Pacific Jazz Records albums